Chen Chi-chung is a Taiwanese politician. He is the Minister of Council of Agriculture since 14 January 2019 after being the acting Minister since 4 December 2018.

Education
Chen obtained his master's degree in agricultural economics from National Taiwan University and doctoral degree in the same field from Texas A&M University in the United States.

Early careers
Chen was appointed as distinguished professor at National Chung Hsing University in 2008–2016. In 2011, he was appointed as the secretary-general of the university and served the position until 2015.

Political careers
In January–May 2016, he was appointed as the chairperson of Rural Economics Society of Taiwan. On 20 May 2016, he was appointed Deputy Minister of Council of Agriculture and served until 13 January 2019 before he was appointed Minister the day after.

See also
 Executive Yuan

References

1966 births
Living people
Taiwanese Ministers of Agriculture